NARAM is the Annual Meet of the National Association of Rocketry (NAR).  It is the national contest culminating the rocket contest year, and also includes fun, or "sport," flying of model rockets for those who don't wish to compete.  The NAR is the governing body for the sport/hobby of model rocketry in the United States. NARAM is traditionally held the first week of August.

History
The first NARAM was held in Denver, Colorado, in 1959 hosted by the Mile-HI section (#1).  G. Harry Stine served as the contest director.  NARAM-2 was hosted by the Peak City Section (#2) in Colorado Springs and the CD was William S. Roe, a co-founder of the NAR.  Fifty years later, NARAM-50 was held at Great Meadow in The Plains, Virginia. NARAM-52, in Pueblo, CO was a tribute to William S. Roe.

Here is a list of NARAMs by year and location and who was the contest director:
 NARAM-1, 1959, Denver, CO.  Contest Director - G. Harry Stine
 NARAM-2, 1960, Colorado Springs, CO.  Contest Director - William S. Roe
 NARAM-3, 1961, Denver, CO. Contest Director - J. Delano Hitch
 NARAM-4, 1962, USAF Academy, CO. Contest Director - Capt. Vernon VanVonderen
 NARAM-5, 1963, Bedford, MA. Contest Director - Marshall P. Wilder
 NARAM-6, 1964, Wallops Island, VA. Contest Director - Dr. William B. Rich
 NARAM-7, 1965, Aberdeen, MD. Contest Director - Howard Galloway
 NARAM-8, 1966, Clinton Co AFB, OH. Contest Director - G. Harry Stine
 NARAM-9, 1967, Mankato, MN. Contest Director - Dr. Ellsworth Beech
 NARAM-10, 1968, Wallops Island, VA. Contest Director - James S. Barrowman
 NARAM-11, 1969, USAF Academy, CO. Contest Director - William S. Roe
 NARAM-12, 1970, Houston, TX. Contest Director - Richard Sipes
 NARAM-13, 1971, Aberdeen, MD. Contest Director - Howard Galloway
 NARAM-14, 1972, Seattle, WA. Contest Director - Jess Medina
 NARAM-15, 1973, Columbus, OH. Contest Director - Dr. Gerald Gregorek
 NARAM-16, 1974, Manassas, VA. Contest Director - Col. Howard Kuhn
 NARAM-17, 1975, Orlando, FL. Contest Director - Richard Q. Fox
 NARAM-18, 1976, Center Valley, PA. Contest Director - Carl J. Warner
 NARAM-19, 1977, Overland Park, KS. Contest Director - Douglas R. Pratt
 NARAM-20, 1978, Anaheim, CA. Contest Director - Larry L. Chaney
 NARAM-21, 1979, Houston, TX. Contest Director - Robert Justis
 NARAM-22, 1980, East Lansing, MI. Contest Director - Keith Campbell
 NARAM-23, 1981, Center Valley, PA. Contest Director - Charlie Sykos
 NARAM-24, 1982, Orlando, FL. Contest Director - Richard Q. Fox
 NARAM-25, 1983, Houston, TX.  Contest Director - Ronald Goforth
 NARAM-26, 1984, Center Valley, PA. Contest Director - Charlie Sykos
 NARAM-27, 1985, Houston, TX. Contest Director - Scott Hunsicker
 NARAM-28, 1986, Chanute AFB, IL. Contest Director - Mark Bundick
 NARAM-29, 1987, Irvine, CA. Contest Director - Martin Bowitz
 NARAM-30, 1988, Huntsville, AL. Contest Director - Matt Steele
 NARAM-31, 1989, Manassas, VA. Contest Director - Trip Barber
 NARAM-32, 1990, Dallas, TX Contest Director- Scott Hunsicker
 NARAM-33, 1991, Elgin, IL. Contest Director - Mark Bundick
 NARAM-34, 1992, Las Vegas, NV. Contest Director -  Bob Sanford
 NARAM-35, 1993, Frederick, MD. Contest Director - Tom Lyon
 NARAM-36, 1994, Houston, TX. Contest Director - Terry White
 NARAM-37, 1995, Geneseo, NY. Contest Director - Dan Wolf
 NARAM-38, 1996, Evansville, IN. Contest Director - Chad Ring
 NARAM-39, 1997, Tucson, AZ. Contest Director - Steve Lubliner
 NARAM-40, 1998, Muncie, IN. Contest Director - Glenn Feveryear
 NARAM-41, 1999, Pittsburgh, PA. Contest Director - Rod Schafer
 NARAM-42, 2000, Estesland, CO. Contest Director - Ken Mizoi
 NARAM-43, 2001, Geneseo, NY. Contest Director - John Viggiano
 NARAM-44, 2002, McGregor, TX. Contest Director - Scott Hunsicker
 NARAM-45, 2003, Evansville, IN. Contest Director - Lila Schmaker
 NARAM-46, 2004, The Plains, VA. Contest Director - Jonathan Rains
 NARAM-47, 2005, West Chester, OH. Contest Director - Mark Fisher
 NARAM-48, 2006, Phoenix, AZ. Contest Director - Matt Steele
 NARAM-49, 2007, Kalamazoo, MI Contest Director- Randy Boadway
 NARAM-50, 2008, The Plains, VA. Contest Director - Jim Filler
 NARAM-51, 2009, Johnstown, PA. Contest Director - Steve Foster
 NARAM-52, 2010, Pueblo, CO. Contest Director - Michael (Mike) Vaughn Konshak 
 NARAM-53, 2011, Lebanon, OH. Contest Director - Chan Stevens
 NARAM-54, 2012, Muskegon, MI. Contest Director- Pam Gilmore
 NARAM-55, 2013, Aurora, OH. Contest Director- Bob Ferrante
 NARAM-56, 2014, Pueblo, CO. Contest Director - Dr. Ryan Coleman. Honorary Contest Directors: Vern & Gleda Estes.
 NARAM-57, 2015, Tucson, AZ. Contest Director - Ed LaCroix
 NARAM-58, 2016, Walnut Grove, MO. Contest Director - John Buckley
 NARAM-59. 2017  Muskegon, MI. Contest Director - Peter Alway
 NARAM-60, 2018  Pueblo, CO. Contest Director - Scott Alexander
 NARAM-61, 2019  Muncie, IN. Contest Director - Brian Guzek
 NARAM-62, 2021  Geneseo, NY Contest Director - Dan Wolf (postponed from 2020 due to COVID-19)
 NARAM-63, 2022  Springfield, MO. Contest Director - Chad Ring

External links
 Web site for NARAM-56
 Web site for the next NARAM
 Web site for NARAM-52
  Web site for NARAM-53
 National Association of Rocketry (NAR) Web site
 NARAM Overview

Model rocketry